José Acasuso was the defending champion but did not compete that year.

Guillermo Coria won in the final 7–5, 6–1 against David Ferrer.

Seeds
A champion seed is indicated in bold text while text in italics indicates the round in which that seed was eliminated.

  Juan Carlos Ferrero (quarterfinals)
  Carlos Moyá (first round)
  Guillermo Coria (champion)
  David Nalbandian (second round)
  Filippo Volandri (first round)
  David Sánchez (second round)
  Dominik Hrbatý (second round)
  Olivier Mutis (quarterfinals)

Draw

References
 2003 Idea Prokom Open Draw

Men's Singles
Singles